The 2006–07 season was Tottenham Hotspur's 15th season in the Premier League and 29th successive season in the top division of the English football league system.

Season summary

Expectations were high at the beginning of the season, after only a bout of food poisoning amongst the squad prevented Spurs from pipping arch-rivals Arsenal to fourth place in the Premiership and UEFA Champions League qualification at the end of the previous season. However, the season was marred by injuries, particularly in defense, with Ledley King, Paul Stalteri, Benoît Assou-Ekotto, Lee Young-pyo, Anthony Gardner, Jermaine Jenas, Steed Malbranque and Teemu Tainio all suffering long-term injuries, while Didier Zokora, Dimitar Berbatov, Robbie Keane and Aaron Lennon all suffered short-term injuries during the season, causing Martin Jol to rarely have a settled first XI to pick for extended periods.

Tottenham's Premiership form in the first half of the season was erratic, although there was a famous home win over reigning champions Chelsea in November amongst the mire of mediocre results. Away form was poor during the first half of the season, but a vast improvement in the second half saw just two away losses from January to the end of the season, including one (narrow) defeat in their final six away games, against Chelsea, just 36 hours after playing a UEFA Cup tie in Spain. The improvement in Spurs' away form, good home performances and an excellent end to the season lifted Spurs into fifth position in the final table and UEFA Cup qualification for the second year running. Tottenham played attractive and effective football as Martin Jol made his mark on the squad, reaching the FA Cup quarter-final before losing 1–2 to Chelsea, having drawn 3–3 away, and the League Cup semi-finals, where they were knocked out by Arsenal after drawing 2–2 at home and losing 3–1 away in extra time. In the UEFA Cup Tottenham progressed to the quarter-finals, where they faced holders and eventual winners Sevilla in the quarter-finals, but were eliminated from the competition 4–3 on aggregate.

On 17 March 2007, Paul Robinson became only the third goalkeeper in Premiership history to score a goal, following his 80-yard lob in the 3–1 victory over Watford.

The highly effective Dimitar Berbatov–Robbie Keane strike partnership was rewarded when they were named joint Player of the Month for April.

Transfers

In

Out

Loaned out

First-team squad

Left club during season

Competitions Overview

Results

Premier League

FA Cup

League Cup

UEFA Cup

First Round

Group Stage

Knockout Rounds

Final Premier League table

Statistics

Appearances

Goal scorers 

The list is sorted by shirt number when total goals are equal.

Clean sheets

The list is sorted by shirt number when total clean sheets are equal.

References

External links
Official Club site
BBC Tottenham Homepage

Tottenham Hotspur F.C. seasons
Tottenham Hotspur

hu:A Tottenham Hotspur 2007–2008-as szezonja